Kalyanpur Assembly constituency is one of 403 legislative assemblies of Uttar Pradesh. It is part of the Akbarpur Lok Sabha constituency in Kanpur district.

Overview
Kalyanpur comprises Wards No. 3, 5, 6, 8, 14, 20, 21, 25, 27, 30, 32, 33, 47, 66, 68, 74, and 104 in Kanpur Municipal Corporation of 2-Kanpur Sadar Tehsil.

Members of Legislative Assembly

Election results

2022

2017

  

  

  

 
|-
! style="background-color:#E9E9E9" align=left width=225|Party
! style="background-color:#E9E9E9" align=right|Seats won
! style="background-color:#E9E9E9" align=right|Seat change
|-
|align=left|Bharatiya Janata Party
| align="center" | 5
| align="center" | 4
|-
|align=left|Samajwadi Party
| align="center" | 0
| align="center" | 4
|-
|align=left|Bahujan Samaj Party
| align="center" | 0
| align="center" | 0
|-
|align=left|Indian National Congress
| align="center" | 0
| align="center" | 0
|-
|}

See also
 List of constituencies of the Uttar Pradesh Legislative Assembly

References

External links
 

Politics of Kanpur
Assembly constituencies of Uttar Pradesh